Nakamachi may refer to:

Places
 Nakamachi, Machida, a district in Machida ward in Tokyo, Japan
 Nakamachi, Setagaya, a district in Setagaya ward in Tokyo, Japan

People
 , a Japanese footballer

Japanese-language surnames